Nyrölä is a district and neighbourhood of Jyväskylä, Finland located  from the city centre.

An amateur astronomical observatory Nyrölä Observatory is located in Nyrölä. Mökkiperä Stage of Rally Finland is driven in Nyrölä.

External links
 
Nyrölä Observatory

Neighbourhoods of Jyväskylä